The Fokker/Republic D.24 was a supersonic variable-sweep wing concept aircraft designed from 1962 to 1968 by the Fokker-Republic Alliance, a coalition between Fokker and Republic Aviation. The project was based out of Schiphol, Netherlands, and led by Alexander Wadkowski of Republic Aviation.

Design
The D.24 was designed to be capable of vertical take-off and landing (VTOL) and was designed in accordance with NATO Basic Military Requirement 3 and competed in NATO's BMR-3 military project bidding. Only a scale model was built and is now located at the Luchtvaartmuseum Aviodrome in Lelystad, Netherlands.

Specifications

See also
List of VTOL aircraft

References

Fokker aircraft
VTOL aircraft